Burgas Peninsula is a predominantly ice-covered peninsula forming the east extremity of Livingston Island in the South Shetland Islands, Antarctica  extending 10 km in the east-northeast direction towards Renier Point and 4.7 km wide.  It is bounded by Bruix Cove, Moon Bay and Mugla Passage to the north, and Bransfield Strait to the south-southeast.  The peninsula's interior is occupied by the Delchev Ridge of Tangra Mountains.

Name origin
Burgas Peninsula is named after the Bulgarian city of Burgas, and in connection with the company Ocean Fisheries – Burgas  whose ships operated in the waters of South Georgia, Kerguelen, the South Orkney Islands, South Shetland Islands and Antarctic Peninsula from 1970 to the early 1990s. The Bulgarian fishermen, along with those of the Soviet Union, Poland and East Germany are the pioneers of modern Antarctic fishing industry.”

Location
British mapping in 1822 and 1968, Chilean in 1971, Argentine in 1980, Spanish mapping in 1991, and Bulgarian topographic survey Tangra 2004/05 and mapping in 2005 and 2009.

See also
 Delchev Ridge
 Livingston Island
 Rugged Rocks

Maps
 L.L. Ivanov et al. Antarctica: Livingston Island and Greenwich Island, South Shetland Islands. Scale 1:100000 topographic map. Sofia: Antarctic Place-names Commission of Bulgaria, 2005.
 L.L. Ivanov. Antarctica: Livingston Island and Greenwich, Robert, Snow and Smith Islands. Scale 1:120000 topographic map. Troyan: Manfred Wörner Foundation, 2010.  (First edition 2009. )
 Antarctic Digital Database (ADD). Scale 1:250000 topographic map of Antarctica. Scientific Committee on Antarctic Research (SCAR). Since 1993, regularly upgraded and updated.
 L.L. Ivanov. Antarctica: Livingston Island and Smith Island. Scale 1:100000 topographic map. Manfred Wörner Foundation, 2017.

Notes

References
 Burgas Peninsula. SCAR Composite Antarctic Gazetteer
 Bulgarian Antarctic Gazetteer. Antarctic Place-names Commission. (details in Bulgarian, basic data in English)
 Ivanov, L. General Geography and History of Livingston Island. In: Bulgarian Antarctic Research: A Synthesis. Eds. C. Pimpirev and N. Chipev. Sofia: St. Kliment Ohridski University Press, 2015. pp. 17–28.

External links
 Burgas Peninsula. Copernix satellite image

Peninsulas of Livingston Island
Bulgaria and the Antarctic
Burgas